Edgardo Rodríguez Juliá (born October 9, 1946) is a Puerto Rican essayist and novelist.

Biography 
Rodríguez Juliá was born in Río Piedras, Puerto Rico. In 1974, he published the first of his eight novels, La renuncia del héroe Baltasar. In 1986 he received a Guggenheim Fellowship for Literature. Since 1999 he has been a member of the Academia Puertorriqueña de la Lengua Española. In June 2011, he lectured at the University of Guadalajara's "Julio Cortázar" Center for the Study of American Literature. In April 2012 he gave the Raimundo Lira Lecture at Harvard University.

Bibliography 

 La renuncia del héroe Baltasar (1974) (published in English as The Renuciation in 1997 by Four Walls Eight Windows, Andrew Hurley, translator)
 Las tribulaciones de Jonás (1981)
 El entierro de Cortijo (1982–1983) (published in a bilingual English-Spanish edition as Cortijo's Wake in 2004 by Duke University Press, Juan Flores, translator)
 Una noche con Iris Chacón (1986)
 Álbum Familiar
 Campeche o los diablejos de la melancolía (1986)
 La noche oscura del niño Avilés (1984)
 Álbum de Puertorriqueños la sagrada familia (1988)
 Camino de Yyaloide (1994)
 Sol de media noche (1995)
 Peloteros (1996)
 Cartagena (1997)
 San Juan: Ciudad Soñada (published in English as San Juan: Memoir of a City in 2007 by University of Wisconsin Press, Peter Grandbois, editor; Antonio Skármeta, introduction)

See also

 List of Puerto Rican writers
List of Puerto Ricans
 Puerto Rican literature

References

 Soledad Bianchi, "Dos cronistas 'isleños': Edgardo Rodríguez Juliá y Pedro Lemebel."  Para romper con el insularismo. Ed. Efrain Barradas and Rita De Maeseneer. Foro Hispanico 29.1 (2006): 41-59.

External links
 Colección Edgardo Rodríguez Juliá, provided by the Universidad del Turabo, retrieved 2014-05-31
 Biographical details
 La narrativa de Edgardo Rodríguez Juliá: “Una presencia inquietante”, por Soledad Bianchi 

1946 births
Living people
People from Río Piedras, Puerto Rico
Puerto Rican writers